Basketene (IUPAC name: pentacyclo[4.4.0.02,5.03,8.04,7]dec-9-ene) is an organic compound with the formula C10H10. It is a polycyclic alkene and the dehydrogenated version of basketane, which was named for its structural similarity to a basket. Due to its hydrocarbon composition and unique structure, the chemical compound is of considerable interest to those examining energy surfaces of these (CH)10 cage molecules and what possible factors influence their minima. Additionally, the complex structure of this compound has intrigued researchers studying the chemistry of highly strained ring systems . Basketene and its family of derivatives also have important chemical and physical properties. These molecules all tend to have a high standard enthalpy of formation, combined with their high density, leading to possible uses in explosives.

Synthesis
Basketene has been synthesized by the isomerization of cyclooctatetraene followed by a Diels–Alder reaction with maleic anhydride. [2 + 2] cycloaddition closes the cage structure, which is converted to basketene by saponification and decarboxylation.
For a more indepth explanation of the synthesis, we start with the commercially available cyclooctatetraene (1), where it undergoes a thermal electrocyclic ring closure 2. Then from 2, a Diels-Alder reaction between  2 and maleic anhydride (3) the tricyclic structure 4. Subsequent [2+2] cycloaddition under photochemical conditions leads to 5. Following saponification with 5 and sodium carbonate gives 6. Finally, through oxidative decarboxylation with Lead(IV) acetate forms the final product, Basketene (7).

Reactions
Families of (CH)n hydrocarbons are characterized by the multiple rearrangements into one another that their members can undergo. These rearrangements can be initiated thermally, photochemically, or under metal catalysis conditions. Basketene and other cage molecules are important for discovering and testing new concepts of bonding and reactivity. Trials with different reagents and reaction conditions have allowed researchers to understand the chemistry of these complex ring systems and how these (CH)10 systems rearrange.

In this reaction using basketene, Nenitzescu’s Hydrocarbon can be obtained. Starting with Basktene, the reaction proceeds through a reverse Diels-Alder intermediate in order to give 8 at 110 ˚C. From 8, a 3,3 shift occurs to give Nenitzescu's hydrocarbon (9). 

Basketene can also undergo the following thermal and photochemical rearrangement reactions. Starting with Basketene, tricyclo[4.4.0.02,5]deca-3,7,9-triene (8) was captured by trapping it as a 1:1 adduct with maleic anhydride. Then photo inducing a conrotary opening of 8 gives cis,cis,trans-cyclooctatriene (10). Furthermore, the photo arrangement of 10 provides the derivative (11). As shown above, 11 will undergo a direct photochemical (2+2) cyclization closure to 12. 

Basktene also rearranges into Snoutene when in solution with Silver nitrate

References

Polycyclic nonaromatic hydrocarbons
Alkene derivatives